Paw Paw is an unincorporated community located in Pike County, Kentucky, United States.

The community was named after the common pawpaw.

References

Unincorporated communities in Pike County, Kentucky
Unincorporated communities in Kentucky